Viden may refer to the following places:

Vídeň (Žďár nad Sázavou District), a municipality and village in the Czech Republic
Vídeň, the Czech name for Vienna
 , a village in Stara Zagora Province, Bulgaria

See also
Vidin, a city in Bulgaria